Ximena Aída Marío Bellido Ugarte (born 10 September 1966) is a retired Peruvian badminton player.
Ximena Bellido was one of the dominant players in her home country and on the South American continent in the 1980s and 1990s. Bellido is the 15-time former National champion, 4-time South American champion and winner of several international titles in Brazil, Argentina and United States. She also represented her country in 1999 Pan American games in Winnipeg, Canada and many editions of World championships across three disciplines. Bellido was conferred with Sports Laurel award in 1988 after winning South American championships.

Achievements

South American Championships 
Women's singles

Women's doubles

Mixed doubles

IBF International 
Women's singles

Women's doubles

Mixed doubles

References 

1966 births
Living people
Peruvian female badminton players
Badminton players at the 1999 Pan American Games
20th-century Peruvian women